Fazakerley railway station is a railway station in Fazakerley, Liverpool, England.  It is situated on the Kirkby branch of the Northern Line of the Merseyrail network.

History
The Liverpool and Bury Railway (L&BR) was authorised in 1845, but while it was under construction, the L&BR amalgamated with the Manchester and Leeds Railway (M&LR) in 1846, and the M&LR in turn was renamed the Lancashire and Yorkshire Railway in 1847. The line opened on 20 November 1848; one of the original stations was Simonswood. This station was renamed twice: it had become Aintree by 1850, and in March 1860 it took its present name Fazakerley to avoid confusion with the nearby  station on a different line, which had opened in 1849.

To the north-east of the station is Fazakerley Junction,  from Manchester Victoria, which is where the North Mersey Branch once headed westwards towards . The branch has closed, but the junction remains as the point where the double track out of Liverpool becomes single track for the last few miles into . The line eastwards was singled in May 1970, though through running beyond Kirkby (to Wigan Wallgate and ) continued until the inauguration of electric operation in May 1977.

Facilities
In common with most Merseyrail stations, it is staffed throughout the day - the street-level ticket office opens 15 minutes prior to start of service and closes at 00:25 each evening (including Sundays).  At platform level, there are digital display screens, timetable posters and shelters on each side; a P.A system also provides automated train running information.  The ticket office is linked to the platforms via a footbridge - this has a lift installed on each side to provide step-free access. There are cycle racks for 4 cycles and secure cycle storage for 20 cycles.

Services
In the evenings after 19:45 and all day Sunday, trains operate every 30 minutes.

Notes

References

External links

Railway stations in Liverpool
DfT Category E stations
Former Lancashire and Yorkshire Railway stations
Railway stations in Great Britain opened in 1848
Railway stations served by Merseyrail